Schalk Burger Brits (born 16 May 1981) is a South African former professional rugby union player who last played for the South Africa national team and the  in Super Rugby. He primarily played as a hooker. He was part of the 2019 Rugby World Cup-winning team.

Personal life
Brits was born in Empangeni, KwaZulu-Natal and attended Paul Roos Gymnasium before going to
Stellenbosch University. He married Colinda Wijnants on 29 January 2011 in Greyton, South Africa.

Club career

Western Province 
Brits played for the Western Province from 2002 to 2004 and rejoined the Cape franchise from 2006 to 2009.

Stormers 
Brits played for the Stormers for four seasons making 51 appearances for them and managing to score 20 points.

Saracens 
Brits made his debut for Saracens in the season opener against London Irish. He scored his first try for Saracens on 27 September 2009 against Gloucester in a 19–16 win. He scored seven tries in the 2009–10 season and played every minute in the Premiership Final against Leicester Tigers, which Saracens lost 33–27.

Brits was voted Players' Player of the year for the 2009–10 season.

In the 2010–11 grand final against Leicester, Brits won the Man of the Match award in a match that Saracens won 22–18.

On 27 June 2011, Brits moved back to his former club Stormers on a short-term loan deal. He played as a back rower for the South African side in the Super Rugby semifinal loss against the Crusaders as a replacement for Duane Vermeulen.

In January 2012, he signed a new deal with the Saracens that kept him at the club for another three seasons. This was later extended, and he remained at Saracens until the end of the 2017–18 season. During his time at Saracens he has won four Premiership titles in 2011, 2015, 2016 and 2018, with Brits featuring in all four finals. He also helped Saracens win the European Champions Cup in 2016 and 2017.

International career

Brits made his international debut against  in 2008. He was next called up when he was included in the Springbok squad that toured Ireland, Scotland and England during the 2012 end-of-year rugby union internationals. He came on as a substitute in the match against Scotland to earn his fourth cap. He earned his fifth cap in their next match, replacing Adriaan Strauss as they beat England 16–15.

Brits returned to international rugby in 2015, coming on as a substitute in South Africa's 2015 Rugby World Cup warm-up match against Argentina, and was then included in South Africa's squad that participated at the 2015 Rugby World Cup.

He was named captain in their match against , playing out of position as an eighth man, and also scored a try in the match. South Africa went on to win the tournament, defeating England in the final.

References

External links

Profile on itsrugby.co.uk
Stormers profile

1981 births
Living people
People from Empangeni
Afrikaner people
South African rugby union players
South Africa international rugby union players
Stormers players
Western Province (rugby union) players
Saracens F.C. players
Golden Lions players
Lions (United Rugby Championship) players
Rugby union hookers
South African expatriate rugby union players
Expatriate rugby union players in England
South African expatriate sportspeople in England
Alumni of Paul Roos Gymnasium
Rugby union players from KwaZulu-Natal
Stellenbosch University alumni